The Apostolic Nunciature to Tajikistan is an ecclesiastical office of the Catholic Church in Tajikistan. It is a diplomatic post of the Holy See, whose representative is called the Apostolic Nuncio with the rank of an ambassador.

The nuncio resides in Kazakhstan.

List of papal representatives to Tajikistan
Apostolic Nuncios 
Marian Oleś (28 December 1996 – 11 December 2001)
Józef Wesołowski (16 February 2002 – 24 January 2008)
Miguel Maury Buendía (12 July 2008 – 5 December 2015)
Francis Assisi Chullikatt (30 April 2016 – 01 October 2022)

References

 
Tajikistan
Holy See
Holy See–Tajikistan relations